Léonce Charles Corne (18 March 1894 – 31 December 1977) was a French film actor. He appeared in 120 films between 1931 and 1974.

Selected filmography

 The Girl and the Boy (1931)
 Luck (1931)
 The Premature Father (1933)
 Forty Little Mothers (1936)
 The Green Jacket (1937)
 The Man from Nowhere (1937)
 Wells in Flames (1937)
 Return at Dawn (1938)
 The Novel of Werther (1938)
 Women's Prison (1938)
 Coral Reefs (1939)
 Happy Days (1941)
 Romance of Paris (1941)
 At Your Command, Madame (1942)
 Forces occultes (1943)
 The Midnight Sun (1943)
 Summer Light (1943)
 Domino (1943)
 The Woman Who Dared (1944)
 Box of Dreams (1945)
 The Bellman (1945)
 Father Goriot (1945)
 Roger la Honte (1946)
 The Lost Village (1947)
 Under the Cards (1948)
 Return to Life (1949)
 Monsieur Octave (1951)
 Alone in Paris (1951)
 Two Pennies Worth of Violets (1951)
 We Are All Murderers (1952)
 The Agony of the Eagles (1952)
 The Beauty of Cadiz (1953)
 The Sparrows of Paris (1953)
 When Do You Commit Suicide? (1953)
 Capitaine Pantoufle (1953)
 Before the Deluge (1954)
 Blood to the Head (1956)
 Thérèse Étienne (1958)
 Certains l'aiment froide (1960)
 Lovers on a Tightrope (1960)
 Le Gentleman d'Epsom (1962)
 On Murder Considered as One of the Fine Arts (1964)
 Your Money or Your Life (1966)
 Alexandre le bienheureux (1968)
 Rendezvous at Bray (1971)

References

External links

1894 births
1977 deaths
French male film actors
People from Beauvais
20th-century French male actors